The Kumeyaay are a Native American people of the Southwestern U.S. and Northwestern Mexico.

Kumeyaay may also refer to:
 Kumeyaay language, spoken by the Kumeyaay people
 Kumeyaay Community College, California
 Kumeyaay Highway or Interstate 8, an interstate highway in California and Arizona
 Kumeyaay Lake, San Diego, California